Charles Wesley Pitman (ca. 1816June 8, 1871) was a Whig member of the U.S. House of Representatives from Pennsylvania.

He was born in New Jersey.  He graduated from Dickinson College in Carlisle, Pennsylvania, in 1838.  He moved to Pottsville, Pennsylvania, the same year and conducted a school for boys, known as the Pottsville Academy.

Pitman was elected as a Whig to the Thirty-first Congress.  He later became affiliated with the Republican Party.  He was engaged extensively in the lumber business.  He was elected sheriff of Schuylkill County, Pennsylvania, in 1870 and served until his death in Pottsville in 1871.  Interment in Presbyterian Cemetery.

Sources

The Political Graveyard

1810s births
1871 deaths
Politicians from Pottsville, Pennsylvania
Pennsylvania sheriffs
American Presbyterians
Whig Party members of the United States House of Representatives from Pennsylvania
19th-century American politicians
Schoolteachers from Pennsylvania
19th-century American educators